Island of Lost Men is a 1939 American crime film directed by Kurt Neumann and starring Anna May Wong and J. Carrol Naish. It tells the story of the daughter of a general who goes to look for her father after he disappears. The film received mixed reviews and was the last that Wong made for Paramount Pictures.

Plot
Kim Ling (Anna May Wong), the daughter of a general accused of embezzling $300,000 of government money, investigates his disappearance. She eventually discovers a labor camp run by Gregory Prin (J. Carrol Naish) north of Singapore. There she meets Chang Tai (Anthony Quinn), who is undercover investigating Prin's activities. Together they manage to discover Ling's father and the money, as well as identify several known fugitives. After the arrival of Tex Ballister (Broderick Crawford), who reveals Tai's true identity and attempts to blackmail Prin, a local rebellion ignites. This allows Ling, her father, and Tai to escape.

Cast
 Anna May Wong as Kim Ling
 J. Carrol Naish as Gregory Prin
 Anthony Quinn as Chang Tai
 Eric Blore as Herbert
 Broderick Crawford as Tex Ballister
 Ernest Truex as Frobenius
 Rudolf Forster as Professor Sen
 William Haade as Hambly

Production
Island of Lost Men was filmed in early 1939. Production was delayed by cost overruns of approximately $25,000. Among the most expensive scenes were those involving the jungle and the river scene. Wong's salary was $6000 with another $1000 paid for overtime, while Quinn only earned $750.

The original title for the film was Guns for China. However, the U.S. State Department implored studios to avoid referencing or alluding to the then-ongoing Second Sino-Japanese War. After discussion with its sales manager in Japan, Paramount Pictures changed the title to Island of Lost Men.

Wong sang "Music on the Shore", composed by Friedrich Hollaender and Frank Loesser. The song was written especially for her.

Release

Island of Lost Men received its American release on August 16, 1939. Critical reception was mixed. Variety praised the general production, acting (especially Wong's), and sets; however, it considered the plot to be "trite". The Daily Variety noted that Wong's singing was "pleasing". The English magazine Kinetographic Weekly was dismissive of the film, but appreciative of Wong's acting. Frank S. Nugent of The New York Times wrote that the "kindliest" thing one could say about the movie is that Naish is in it, "only this time with a slant to Mr. Naish's villainous eyes", and that the jungle setting was so unbelievable that it implied that "if the camera were swung no more than a frame or so to either side it would reveal a filling station, or a roadside food dispensary in the shape of a hot dog".

Island of Lost Men proved to be Wong's last film with Paramount. The studio did not renew her contract afterwards, possibly because of the budget overruns in Island.

See also
White Woman (1933)

References
Footnotes

Bibliography

External links
 
 
 

1939 films
Films directed by Kurt Neumann
Paramount Pictures films
Films set in Malaysia
Films set in Singapore
American black-and-white films
Remakes of American films
American mystery films
1939 mystery films
1930s English-language films
1930s American films